Ambrose Patrick Kennedy (December 1, 1875 – March 10, 1967) was a U.S. Representative from Rhode Island.

Born in Blackstone, Massachusetts, Kennedy attended the Blackstone public schools and St. Hyacinthe's College, Province of Quebec, Canada.  He graduated from College of the Holy Cross, Worcester, Massachusetts, in 1897.  He served as principal of the Blackstone High School 1898-1904 and as superintendent of schools 1906-1908.  He graduated from the Boston University Law School in 1906.  He was admitted to the bar the same year and commenced practice in Woonsocket, Rhode Island.  He served as aide-de-camp on the personal staff of Gov. Aram J. Pothier with the rank of colonel 1909-1913.  He was a member of the Rhode Island House of Representatives 1911-1913, serving as speaker in 1912.

Kennedy was elected as a Republican to the Sixty-third and to the four succeeding Congresses (March 4, 1913 – March 3, 1923).  He was not a candidate for renomination in 1922.  He resumed the practice of law.  He died in Woonsocket, Rhode Island, March 10, 1967.  He was interred in St. Paul's Cemetery, Blackstone, Massachusetts.

Sources

External links

 

1875 births
1967 deaths
Speakers of the Rhode Island House of Representatives
People from Blackstone, Massachusetts
College of the Holy Cross alumni
Republican Party members of the Rhode Island House of Representatives
American school administrators
Boston University School of Law alumni
Rhode Island lawyers
American expatriates in Canada
People using the U.S. civilian title colonel
Republican Party members of the United States House of Representatives from Rhode Island
People from Massachusetts